IHRB may refer to:

 I Hate Running Backwards, video game
 Irish Horseracing Regulatory Board, regulates conduct of horse racing in Ireland